Walter de Souza Goulart (17 July 1912 – 13 November 1951), known as just Walter, was a Brazilian footballer who played as a goalkeeper. He played for Brazil national team at the 1938 FIFA World Cup finals, where they managed a third-place finish.

References

1912 births
1951 deaths
Brazilian footballers
Brazil international footballers
1938 FIFA World Cup players
Association football goalkeepers
Footballers from Rio de Janeiro (city)